Shamar may refer to:
 Shammar, an Arab tribe
 Shamar, Afghanistan
 Shamar, Iran
 Shamar (given name), given name to a boys or girls
 Shamar, a fictional country in Sonic Unleashed